Little Dragon is the debut studio album by Swedish electronic music band Little Dragon. It was first released in Japan on 15 August 2007 by Village Again Records, and subsequently in the United Kingdom on 3 September 2007 by Peacefrog Records.

Track listing

Notes
 The Japanese edition includes the bonus track "Fortune" as track 3, between "Turn Left" and "Recommendation".

Personnel
Credits adapted from the liner notes of Little Dragon.

Little Dragon
 Yukimi Nagano – vocals, percussion, keyboards
 Erik Bodin – drums, keyboards, vocals
 Fredrik Wallin – bass, keyboards, percussion
 Håkan Wirenstrand – keyboards, drums, vocals

Technical
 Pete Hutchison – mastering

Artwork
 Yusuke Nagano – illustrations, design

Additional musicians
 Kalle Ekström – saxophone 
 Jens Nilsson – saxophone 
 Björn Almgren – saxophone 
 Johan Arias – saxophone 
 Agge – guitar

Release history

References

2007 debut albums
Little Dragon albums
Peacefrog Records albums
Electropop albums